The Standards in Public Office Commission (SIPO) is an independent body established in December 2001 by the Irish Government under the Standards in Public Office Act, 2001. It replaced the Public Offices Commission which was established in November 1995 by the Ethics in Public Office Act, 1995.

The current government has enacted legislation to introduce an Electoral Commission, which would initially replace SIPO's electoral functions as well as handling other functions relating to elections and referendums in the state. SIPO's other functions would be transferred to the Electoral Commission at a later date.

Functions of the commission
The commission is the supervisory body for compliance with legislation concerning ethical issues regarding politicians, office holders and civil servants

Political donations
The commission supervises compliance with legislation limiting donations to political parties in Ireland and election expenditure.  This is a broad remit and applies to donations received by sitting Members of both Houses of the Oireachtas and members of the European Parliament representing Irish constituencies.  It also applies to individual candidates at elections for Dáil Éireann, Seanad Éireann, the European Parliament and the President of Ireland.  The commission maintains the Register of Corporate Donors and the Register of Third Parties.  The Commission makes reports to the Chairman of Dáil Éireann Ceann Comhairle in relation to donations.

Disclosure of interests by politicians
The commission supervises the disclosure of interests by politicians.  All members of the Houses of the Oireachtas must provide the commission with tax clearance certificates.  This also applies to the Attorney General and senior State-appointed members of public bodies. The Commission lays down guidelines and gives advice in individual cases.  The Commission provides  these statements of interests to the Clerk of Dáil Éireann or the Clerk of Seanad Éireann as appropriate, who publish registers of Members’ interests.

Expenditure of state funding
The commission monitors the expenditure of State funding by political parties.  It makes reports to the Chairman of Dáil Éireann Ceann Comhairle on the use of State financing by political parties under the Electoral Acts.

Party leaders' allowances and Parliamentary Activities Allowance 
The Commission examines expenditure paid from the annual allowances to the leaders of parliamentary parties for expenses arising from the parties' parliamentary activities, including research. The commission makes reports to the Minister for Finance on the expenditure of the party leaders' allowances. Since 1 July 2014, the Party Leader's Allowance has been replaced by the Parliamentary Activities Allowance.

Complaints and investigations
The commission may receive complaints and carry out investigations against alleged breaches of the Ethics Acts. It may not receive complaints about Members of the Oireachtas as these are dealt with by the Oireachtas.

The commission may carry out investigations and hold sittings under the Ethics Acts. It provides a report to interested parties and those specified in the legislation. The investigation reports are published on its website.

Codes of conduct, guidelines and advice
The commission issues codes of conduct for politicians, office holders, and civil servants. It also issues statutory guidelines for compliance. The commission may also designate officials to give individual advice to individuals affected by the Ethics Acts.

Own initiative inquiries  
The commission can decide to open an investigation on its own initiative for breaches of the Ethics Acts.

Annual reports and recommendations for change
The Commission makes annual reports to the Minister for Public Expenditure and Reform which are laid before each House of the Oireachtas.  In the annual reports, the commission makes recommendations for changes to ethics and other relevant legislation.  The 2013 annual report summarises all previous recommendations.

Regulation of Lobbying 
The commission has been given new responsibility by the Regulation of Lobbying Act 2015 which introduces a statutory register of lobbying, and rules concerning the practice of lobbying. The purpose of the Act is to provide for a web-based Register of Lobbying to make information available to the public on the identity of those communicating with designated public officials on specific policy, legislative matters or prospective decisions.  The Act provides restrictions and conditions on the taking up of certain employments by certain designated officials for a specified period of time where a possible conflict of interest arises. The Act states that the Standards Commission will be the Registrar of Lobbying and will establish an online Register of Lobbying. The Standards Commission will oversee the implementation of the register, monitor compliance, provide guidance and assistance and where necessary investigate and pursue breaches of legal requirements in due course. The Act was signed into law on Wednesday 11 March 2015.

The focus in the initial period of the implementation of the Act was on guidance and information and ensuring that registrants were familiar with the process of submitting their returns online.   Enforcement provisions provided for in Part 4 of the Regulation of Lobbying Act 2015 (the Act) did not come into effect until 1 January 2017.  From 1 January 2017, however, a person who does not register as required by the Act or does not submit a return of their lobbying activities or is late submitting a return of their lobbying activities is subject to the offences and penalties provided for in the Act.

Register of third parties
Since the Electoral (Amendment) Act 2001, SIPO has maintained a register of "third parties", defined as "any individual or group, other than a registered political party or election candidate, who or which accepts, in a particular calendar year, a donation for political purposes exceeding the value of €100". Auditing of "third party" activities addresses the minor issue of outside endorsements of election candidates and the major issue of interest groups and civil society organisations which lobby during referendum campaigns. SIPO said in a 2003 report:
it is not the intention of the Standards Commission to pursue each individual and group involved in every type of campaign where the activities could be covered by the definition of political purposes. Such individuals or groups will, however, be contacted by the Standards Commission for clarification of their position if a complaint, or other information, is received about their failure to register.
After SIPO wrote to some groups which advocated against the Protection of Life During Pregnancy Act 2013, Catherine Murphy complained that SIPO had no power to enforce registration. SIPO noted in a 2008 report that 'In practice, the vast majority of third parties have registered with the Standards Commission in relation to a particular campaign and their "political" activity has not extended beyond that campaign.' Whether a given a donation is for "political purposes" may be controversial. In 2018 Amnesty International Ireland was ordered to return a 2015 donation from the Open Society Foundations on the grounds that contravened the prohibition on foreign donorations because it was political, being related to liberalising Ireland's abortion laws.

Members of the Commission
There are six members of the Standards Commission.  The chairperson is a judge, or a former judge,
of the Supreme Court or the High Court, and is appointed by the President of Ireland on the advice of the Irish Government following resolutions passed by each House of the Oireachtas recommending the appointment.  There are four ex-officio members: the Comptroller and Auditor General, the Ombudsman, the Clerk of Dáil Éireann and the Clerk of Seanad Éireann.  The ex-officio membership is the same as for the Referendum Commission.  The sixth member is a former member of one of the Houses of the Oireachtas, and is appointed by the Irish Government following approval by each House of the Oireachtas.

The Chairperson of the Standards Commission is ex-officio member (Commissioner) of the Commission for Public Service Appointments.

See also
Good Governance
Ethics

References

External links

Commission for Public Service Appointments
Office of the Comptroller and Auditor General

Politics of the Republic of Ireland
Government agencies of the Republic of Ireland
Anti-corruption agencies
Political funding
Elections in the Republic of Ireland